The Douglas XT3D was an American three-seat torpedo bomber biplane developed by the Douglas Aircraft Company to meet a United States Navy requirement.

Development

The XT3D torpedo bomber (BuNo 8730) was first flown in 1931, it has been described as a large and ugly aircraft. Of metal construction with a fabric covering the XT3D had folding wings and an arrestor hook for carrier operation. With a fixed tailwheel landing gear and powered by a Pratt & Whitney R-1690 Hornet radial engine, the XT3D had three open cockpits, forward for the gunner/bomb-aimer, centre for the pilot, rear for another gunner.

The XT3D failed to meet the Navy's requirements and after tests was returned to Douglas. It was modified with a more powerful Pratt & Whitney XR-1830-54 radial, and wheel fairings and the two rear cockpits were enclosed. Re-designated XT3D-2, it still failed to pass Navy trials and was not ordered into production. The prototype was used by the Navy for the next ten years for general purpose use until it was relegated as an instructional airframe in 1941.

Variants

XT3D-1
Prototype powered by a Pratt & Whitney R-1690 radial, one built.
XT3D-2
Prototype modified including a change to a Pratt & Whitney R-1830 radial.

Operators

United States Navy

Specifications

See also

References

Notes

Bibliography

 

T3D
1930s United States bomber aircraft
Single-engined tractor aircraft
Carrier-based aircraft
Biplanes
Aircraft first flown in 1931